Hertz Grosbard (1892−1994) performed recitations of Yiddish literature during the 20th century. He was born in Lodz to a religious family. During the 1920s he began performing what came to be known as his “word concerts” to great critical acclaim. During the "word concerts" he recited classics of Yiddish literature such as works of Itsik Manger and Scholem Aleichem. He was very popular and performed extensively both in Europe, the Americas, and in Israel, e.g. in Vilnius he performed more than 50 times between 1928 and 1940. Ten albums with selections of his word concerts were issued in the 1950s and 1960s. He held his last concert in 1992 in Holon, Israel, in conjunction with his 100th birthday.

Further reading
The Grosbard Project - Online Archive of Grosbard’s Word Concerts Includes additional information on Grosbard and recordings of his recitations.

References

Yiddish culture
Polish centenarians
Men centenarians
1892 births
1994 deaths
Yiddish-language literature
Yiddish theatre
Jewish theatre